The Lüschgrat is a mountain of the Swiss Lepontine Alps, located between Safien and Thusis in the canton of Graubünden. With a height of 2,178 metres above sea level, it is the culminating point of the range north of the Glas Pass.

References

External links
 Lüschgrat on Hikr

Mountains of the Alps
Mountains of Switzerland
Mountains of Graubünden
Lepontine Alps
Two-thousanders of Switzerland
Tschappina
Safiental